Dani Spanić Utrera (born 10 December 1973) is a Venezuelan model, actress and TV host. She is a twin sister of actress Gabriela Spanic.

Personal life
She became a naturalized citizen of Mexico in 2006. In 2007, she famously fell into a coma while in her fifth month of pregnancy, which brought an outpouring of emotion from the world's press. She eventually came out of her coma, with the help of singer Marta Sanchez.

Filmography

TV series 
 Desde Adentro Con Dani (2013–present)
 La duda (2002) Blanca
Como tú, ninguna (1995) 1 Episodes

References 
 

1973 births
Living people
People from Guárico
Venezuelan emigrants to Mexico
Naturalized citizens of Mexico
Venezuelan telenovela actresses
Venezuelan people of Croatian descent
Venezuelan people of British descent
Venezuelan twins